Trade marketing is a discipline of marketing that relates to increasing the demand at wholesaler, retailer, or distributor level rather than at the consumer level.  However, there is a need to continue with Brand Management strategies to sustain the need at the consumer end. A shopper, who may or may not be the consumer themself, is the one who identifies and purchases a product from a retailer even though they might not purchase the goods at the end of the day.  To ensure that a retailer promotes a company's product against competitors', that company must market its product to the retailers as well by offering steep discounts versus competitors.  Trade marketing might also include offering various tangible/intangible benefits to retailers such as commissions made for sales. 

Trade marketing is the basic idea of marketing your products through the value chain and at the point of sale i.e. the store. Consider it the thought of creating a demand for your products across the channel and before it reaches the consumer. This traditionally exists in a brick and mortar environment and can be argued to be one of the oldest forms of marketing.

Targets of trade marketing

Distributor/Dealer

Distributor/givers are (is part of route to market) channel trade partners who act as a medium to ensure stock delivery/availability for the consumer across the geographies. The name of these entities is absolutely critical as they help in ensuring that the product is widely distributed and available for the end consumer. The key benefit of these entities is in ensuring that the distribution costs are lower for the manufacturer and simultaneously the products are available for the end consumer. The distributor and dealers operate on a base trade margin (factored in the cost of the product by the manufacturer). Along with the base margin the trade partners also get additional schemes/incentives which keep on varying from time to time and product to product. The dealer could be a Retailer (selling to end consumer directly), wholesaler (selling to other retailers primarily) or a modern retailer (i.e. self-service stores like the Walmart, Carrefour, Tesco, Auchan etc. which are into both the consumer retailing and wholesaling).

Sales outlet
Sales outlet means a retailer. A retailer is also one of the customers in trade marketing targets. Plans of trade marketing is targeting customers and shoppers. Therefore, trade marketing should provide sales outlets with customer & shopper-based value creation plans. Sales outlets (customers) are a place that manufacturer can meet shoppers and consumers.

Methods of trade marketing
Basic method of trade marketing is focusing on sales fundamentals, such as Distribution, Display, Promotion and Price. With data and knowledge of sales fundamentals, trade marketing develops market strategy aligned with brand strategy. In order to deliver sales volume and value, trade marketing support sales forces with well-designed fundamental enhancement plans.

Current trends in trade marketing
Shopkeepers and retailers are becoming more and more profit margin oriented.  They seek to extract maximum margins from one company, by quoting higher margins being given to a competitor company.

A current trend in trade marketing is the focus on customer data. According to a research conducted by Deloitte in 2016, digital experiences and interactions influence customer spending. This tendency has been noticed by retailers and it has affected their strategies. Retailers focus their efforts into e-mail, mobile and social media marketing activities in order to deliver personalized consumer experiences. Therefore, marketers have to create comprehensive trade marketing strategies that will be based on customer data, aimed also at the delivery of personalized customer experiences which influence sales and purchasing behaviors.

Shopper marketing
Shopper marketing may be included in trade marketing, therefore the shopper being another target for trade marketing managers, while it can also be considered as a separate discipline.  Some of the activities to increase demand at shopper level include setting the right planogram, price announcements such as inserts, use of point of purchase materials, alternatively called promotional material.

KPI  Trade marketing
 active customer base - distribution, sales outlets which buy products of company
 middle order from a sales outlet
 share  trade shelf
 fullness on trade shelf
 regular presence of must stock
 right representation planograms
 accommodation POS 
 additional space for products of company
 lack of OOS
 low level of commodity rests
 knowledge about product in sales outlets

See also
 Business-to-business
 List of basic marketing topics
 List of marketing topics
 Marketing
 Marketing strategy
 Shopper marketing

References

External links

 Marketing dictionary
 Trade Marketing and Commercial Strategies - Università di Parma
 What is Trade Marketing? In Hindi

Supply chain management